Liham at Lihim  is the seventh album by the Filipino rapper Gloc-9. In an interview by Myx, Gloc-9 stated that he had a dream collaboration with a certain artist that happened on this album (though he did not reveal the name of that artist). The album has tracks featuring Regine Velasquez-Alcasid, Rico Blanco, Quest, Marc Abaya, Zia Quizon, Kamikazee, Eunice Jorge of Gracenote, Denise Barbacena and Sly Kane. The album is released in October 2013 with the song "Magda" featuring Rico Blanco as its first single. It has 12 tracks under the Universal label.

Track listing

Certifications

References 

Gloc-9 albums
2013 albums
Universal Records (Philippines) albums